Major General Robert Arthur Hay,  (9 April 1920 – 26 January 1998) was an Australian Army general. He also played Australian rules football and made two appearances in 1942 for Richmond in the Victorian Football League (VFL).

Both of Hay's VFL games were finals. He made his debut in Richmond's semi-final win over Essendon at Princes Park and also played in the 1942 VFL Grand Final two weeks later against the same opponent, as a half forward flanker. Richmond lost the grand final by 53 points and Hay never played again for the club.

Hay went on to have a distinguished career in the Australian Army, serving as Commander of Australian Military Forces in Vietnam from 1969 to 1970. He was Commandant of the Royal Military College in Duntroon.

References

|-

1920 births
Australian generals
Australian Army personnel of World War II
Australian military personnel of the Vietnam War
Australian Companions of the Order of the Bath
Australian Members of the Order of the British Empire
Australian rules footballers from Victoria (Australia)
Richmond Football Club players
Collegians Football Club players
1998 deaths